Cruden Bay railway station was a railway station serving Cruden Bay, Aberdeenshire, Scotland.

History
The station opened on 2 August 1897.

The station was destroyed by fire on 23 April 1931 and it closed in 1932.

From 1899 to 1932, a passenger tramway service from the station to the Cruden Bay Hotel was provided by the Cruden Bay Hotel Tramway. After the station closed to passenger traffic the tramway continued with freight services until 1945.

References

 

Disused railway stations in Aberdeenshire
Former Great North of Scotland Railway stations
Railway stations in Great Britain opened in 1897
Railway stations in Great Britain closed in 1932
1897 establishments in Scotland
1945 disestablishments in Scotland